The 2022 Hankook 12 Hours of Mugello was the 8th running of the 12 Hours of Mugello. It was also 2nd round of the 2022 24H GT and 2022 TCE Series. The race was won by Samantha Tan, Bryson Morris, and Nick Wittmer in the #1 ST Racing BMW M4 GT3.

Schedule

Entry list
40 cars were entered into the event; 32 GT cars and 8 TCEs.

Results

Qualifying
Qualifying this year was split into three qualifying sessions, and the average of their best times per qualifying session being used as the final benchmark to determine starting order.

TCE
Fastest in class in bold.

GT
Fastest in class in bold.

Race

Part 1
Class winner in bold.

Part 2
Class winner in bold.

Footnotes

References

External links

2022 in Italian motorsport
March 2022 sports events in Italy
2022 in 24H Series